P/2016 J1 (PanSTARRS) is a pair of kilometre-sized active main-belt asteroids that split apart from each other in early 2010. The brightest component of the pair, P/2016 J1-A, was discovered first by the Pan-STARRS 1 survey at Haleakalā Observatory on 5 May 2016. Follow-up observations by the Canada-France-Hawaii Telescope at Mauna Kea Observatory discovered the second component, P/2016 J1-B, on 6 May 2016. It is the youngest asteroid pair discovered .

Orbit

Asteroid family 
In 2018, an orbit analysis by Hsieh et al. found that both components of P/2016 J1 are related to the Theobalda asteroid family of C-, F-, and X-type asteroids. The Theobalda family likely originated as fragments from an impact event that shattered a -diameter parent body  million years ago. Another ice-sublimating active asteroid, 427P/ATLAS (P/2017 S5), was also identified to be part the Theobalda family, suggesting that some members of this family were able to retain subsurface water ice since the collision that formed them.

See also 
 Asteroid pair
 Active asteroid
 P/2013 R3 (Catalina–PanSTARRS) – an active asteroid that completely disintegrated due to rotational breakup
 331P/Gibbs – another active asteroid disintegrating and fragmenting by rotational breakup

References

External links 
 P/2016 J1: an asteroid that split in two and whose fragments, years later, developed tails, Silbia López de Lacalle, Instituto de Astrofísica de Andalucía, 28 February 2017
 The Splitting of Double-component Active Asteroid P/2016 J1 (PANSTARRS), presentation by Fernando Moreno, European Space Agency, 2017
 P/2016 J1 ( PanSTARRS ), Seiichi Yoshida, updated 3 March 2018
 

Cometary object articles

Encke-type comets
Split comets

Discoveries by Pan-STARRS
Comets in 2016
20160505